Orion Jean is a Haitian American author and philanthropist who was named Time Kid of the Year.

Awards and honors 

 Time Kid of the Year in 2021
 Was in cover of Time on February 28, 2022
 Top 10 Youth Volunteers of 2021 by Prudential Spirit of Community Award
 Gloria Barron Prize for Young Heroes in 2022

Missions 
He is the founder of Race to Kindness program in which he donates meals, books and toys to children. In 2021 he donated 100,000 meals on a mission to spread kindness. In 2020, he donated more than 600 toys to Children's Hospital in North Texas. In 2021, he collected more than 500,000 books for the kids in need in which ThriftBooks also supported him.

References 

Living people

Year of birth missing (living people)
American people of Haitian descent
Time Kid of the Year